Unconscious inference (German: unbewusster Schluss), also referred to as unconscious conclusion, is a term of perceptual psychology coined in 1867 by the German physicist and polymath Hermann von Helmholtz to describe an involuntary, pre-rational and reflex-like mechanism which is part of the formation of visual impressions. While precursory notions have been identified in the writings of Thomas Hobbes, Robert Hooke, and Francis North (especially in connection with auditory perception) as well as in Francis Bacon's Novum Organum, Helmholtz's theory was long ignored or even dismissed by philosophy and psychology. It has since received new attention from modern research, and the work of recent scholars has approached Helmholtz's view.

In the third and final volume of his Handbuch der physiologischen Optik (1856–67, translated as Treatise on Physiological Optics in 1920-25, available here), Helmholtz discussed the psychological effects of visual perception. His first example is that of the illusion of the sun rotating around the earth:

Optical illusions

We are unable to do away with such optical illusions by convincing ourselves rationally that our eyes have played tricks on us: obstinately and unswervingly, the mechanism follows its own rule and thus wields an imperious mastery over the human mind. While optical illusions are the most obvious instances of unconscious inference, people's perceptions of each other are similarly influenced by such unintended, unconscious conclusions. Helmholtz's second example refers to theatrical performance, arguing that the strong emotional effect of a play results mainly from the viewers' inability to doubt the visual impressions generated by unconscious inference:

The mere sight of another person is sufficient to produce an emotional attitude without any reasonable basis whatsoever, yet highly resilient against all rational criticism. Obviously, the impression is based on the spontaneous, spurious attribution of traits - a process we can hardly avoid, for the human eye, so to speak, is incapable of doubt and thus cannot ward off the impression.

The formation of visual impressions, Helmholtz realized, is achieved primarily by unconscious judgments, the results of which "can never once be elevated to the plane of conscious judgments" and thus "lack the purifying and scrutinizing work of conscious thinking". In spite of this, the results of unconscious judgments are so impervious to conscious control, so resistant to contradiction that they are "impossible to get rid of" and "the effect of them cannot be overcome". So whatever impressions this unconscious inference process leads to, they strike "our consciousness as a foreign and overpowering force of nature".

The reason, Helmholtz suggested, lies in the way visual sensory impressions are processed neurologically. The higher cortical centres responsible for conscious deliberation are not involved in the formation of visual impressions. However, as the process is spontaneous and automatic, we are unable to account for just how we arrived at our judgments. Through our eyes, we necessarily perceive things as real, for the results of the unconscious conclusions are interpretations which "are urged on our consciousness, so to speak, as if an external power had constrained us, over which our will has no control".

In recognizing these attitude-formation mechanisms underlying the human processing of nonverbal cues, Helmholtz anticipated developments in science by more than a century. As Daniel Gilbert has pointed out, "Helmholtz presaged many current thinkers not only by postulating the existence of such [unconscious inferential] operations, but also by describing their general features". At the same time, he added, it is "probably fair to say that Helmholtz's ideas about the social inference process have exerted no impact whatsoever on social psychology". Indeed, psychologists have largely felt that Helmholtz had fallen prey to an error in reasoning. As Edwin G. Boring summed up the debate, "Since an inference is ostensibly a conscious process and can therefore be neither unconscious nor immediate, [Helmholtz's] view was rejected as self-contradictory". However, several recent authors have since approached Helmholtz's conception under a variety of headings, such as "snap judgments", "nonconscious social information processing", "spontaneous trait inference", "people as flexible interpreters", and "unintended thought". Siegfried Frey has pointed out the revolutionary quality of Helmholtz's proposition that it is from the perceiver, not the actor, whence springs the meaning-attribution process performed when we interpret a nonverbal stimulus:

Influences in current computer science and psychology

The Helmholtz machine 
Work in computer science has made use of Helmholtz's ideas of unconscious inference by suggesting the cortex contains a generative model of the world. They develop a statistical method for discovering the structure inherent in a set of patterns:

Free energy principle 

The Free energy principle provides an explanation for embodied perception in neuroscience and
tries to explain how biological systems maintain order by restricting themselves to a limited number of states or beliefs about hidden states in their environment. A biological system performs active inference in sampling action outcomes to maximise the evidence for its model of the world:

Notes

References 
 
 
 
 
 
 
  Quotations are from the English translation produced by Optical Society of America (1924–25): Treatise on Physiological Optics.
 
 
 
 
 
 
 Universität Duisburg-Essen: Designing virtual humans for Web 2.0 based learning processes - Unconscious judgments.

Perception
Cognitive science